Richard Bowyer may refer to:

Richard Bowyer (MP), MP for Arundel
Richard Bowyer (priest) (died 1471), Canon of Windsor

See also
Richard Bowyer Smith (1837–1919), Australian inventor